Knut Andersen (8 October 1930 – 28 May 2002) was a Norwegian footballer. He played in one match for the Norway national football team in 1952.

References

External links
 
 

1930 births
2002 deaths
Norwegian footballers
Norway international footballers
Association football forwards
Sarpsborg FK players